John Barnet (died 1373) was a Bishop of Worcester then Bishop of Bath and Wells then finally Bishop of Ely.

Barnet was selected Bishop of Worcester about 16 December 1361, and consecrated on 20 March 1362. He was translated to the see of Bath about 28 November 1363.

Barnet was selected as Lord High Treasurer in February 1363 and held the office until June 1369.

Barnet was translated to the see of Ely on 15 December 1366. He died as Bishop of Ely on 8 June 1373.

Citations

References

 

Bishops of Bath and Wells
1373 deaths
Bishops of Worcester
Bishops of Ely
Lord High Treasurers of England
14th-century English Roman Catholic bishops
Year of birth unknown